Rhino What You Did Last Summer is a 2009 novel by Irish journalist and author Paul Howard, and the ninth in the Ross O'Carroll-Kelly series.

The title refers to the film I Know What You Did Last Summer and to Ross's rhinoplasty.

Plot
Ross travels to Los Angeles to win Sorcha back; he and his family become reality television stars on Ross, His Mother, His Wife and Her Lover; Ross is persuaded to undergo cosmetic surgery, and Honor becomes addicted to caffeine. Fionnuala's novels begin to earn popularity in America.

Reception
The novel was the seventh highest-selling book in Ireland for the year 2009.

In The Irish Times, Ferdia Mac Anna wrote that it was "inexcusably shallow, deliberately vulgar, puerile and offensive – and it made me laugh like a drain. Indeed, there are sequences so funny that I had trouble breathing."

Author Paul Howard later admitted that taking the action outside of Ireland was a mistake: "Ross needs to be here in an environment that he - and the reader - knows well."

References

2009 Irish novels
Penguin Books books
Ross O'Carroll-Kelly
Reality television series parodies
Fiction set in 2007